Richard Pettigrew may refer to:

 Richard F. Pettigrew (1848–1926), American lawyer, surveyor and U.S. Senator from South Dakota
 Richard A. Pettigrew (born 1930), American politician in the state of Florida